Johann Adam Pupikofer (17 March  1797 – 28 July 1882) was a Swiss
historian, from 1861 curator of the Thurgau cantonal archive in Frauenfeld.

Pupikofer is known for his History of Thurgau (published in two volumes 1828, 1830). He also authored a large number of smaller publications dealing with the history of Thurgau and the Lake Constance region.  In 1872 he received an honorary doctoral degree from the University of Zurich. Pupikofer was a close friend of German antiquary Joseph von Laßberg.

Literatur 

 
 Hans Ulrich Wepfer: Johann Adam Pupikofer (1797–1882). In: Thurgauische Beiträge zur vaterländischen Geschichte, Bd. 106 (1969), S. 3–204. 
  

19th-century Swiss historians
Swiss male writers
People from Thurgau
1797 births
1882 deaths